Michailis "Missas" Pantazopoulos (alternate spelling: Misas) (Greek: Μιχάλης "Μίσσας" Πανταζόπουλος; 1924 – 25 April 2006) was a Greek professional basketball player and coach.

Playing career

Club career
During his club career, Pantazopoulos played with the Greek teams Panellionios and Panathinaikos. With Panellinios, he won 2 Greek League championships, in 1939 and 1940. He also won 3 Greek League championships with Panathinaikos, in 1946, 1947, and 1950.

National team career
Pantazopoulos was a member of the senior Greek national basketball team. With Greece, he won the bronze medal at the 1949 EuroBasket.

Coaching career

Clubs
During his playing career, Papazoglou was also a player-coach. He continued to work as a basketball coach, after he retired from playing. He was the head coach of the Greek clubs Panathinaikos and AEK Athens. As a head coach, he won a total of 8 Greek League championships.

He won the Greek League championship with Panathinaikos, in 1946, 1947, 1950, and 1951. He also won the Greek League championship with AEK Athens, in 1963, 1964, 1965, and 1966. He also led AEK Athens to the 1966 FIBA European Champions Cup Final Four (1966 EuroLeague Final Four).

National team
Pantazopoulos was also the head coach of the senior Greek national basketball team. He was Greece's head coach at the 1967 Mediterranean Games, and the 1967 EuroBasket. He also coached Greece at the 1968 and 1969 Balkan Championships.

References

External links
FIBA Profile
Hellenic Basketball Federation Player Profile 
Hellenic Basketball Federation Coach Profile 

1924 births
2006 deaths
AEK B.C. coaches
Greek basketball coaches
Greek men's basketball players
Greece national basketball team coaches
Panathinaikos B.C. coaches
Panathinaikos B.C. players
Panellinios B.C. players